Jason Peter "Jay" Garrick is a superhero appearing in American comic books published by DC Comics. He is the first character known as the Flash. The character first appeared in Flash Comics #1 (January 1940), created by writer Gardner Fox and artist Harry Lampert. 

Garrick gained the ability to move at superhuman speed due to a laboratory accident. Jay chose to fight crime as a costumed vigilante, while calling himself "the Flash". Jay Garrick has made numerous appearances in other media. The character made its live-action debut as a cameo in the television series Smallville, played by Billy Mitchell. He later appeared as a recurring character in the Arrowverse television series The Flash, played by John Wesley Shipp, and in a guest capacity in the television series Stargirl, played again by Shipp.

Publication history

The character of Jay Garrick was created by Gardner Fox (Writer) and Harry Lampert (Artist). His first appearance was in Flash Comics #1, the pilot issue of Flash Comics, which was published in 1940 by All-American Publications. He was soon featured in All-Star Comics as part of the Justice Society of America. In 1941, he got his own solo comic book series, All-Flash.

After World War II, superheroes declined in popularity, causing many of the Flash's comic book series to be canceled. All-Flash was canceled in 1948 after 32 issues. Flash Comics was canceled in 1949 after 104 issues. All-Star Comics was canceled in 1951 after 57 issues, marking Garrick's last Golden Age appearance. Garrick would not appear again for ten years, and never got another solo series.

In 1956, DC Comics reinvented the Flash character, giving him a new costume, name, and background. This new Flash, named Barry Allen, was completely unrelated to Jay Garrick. In fact, Garrick had never existed, as far as the new books were concerned. Barry Allen's first appearance shows him reading a copy of Flash Comics, lamenting that Garrick was "just a character some writer dreamed up". Readers welcomed the new Flash, but still had an interest in the old one.

Jay Garrick made a guest appearance in Flash #123. In this issue, Garrick was treated as residing in a parallel universe (Earth-Two), which allowed the character to exist without any continuity conflicts with Barry Allen (who existed on Earth-One), yet allowed him to make guest appearances in Silver Age books. For most of the 60s and 70s, Garrick made guest appearances. However, starting in 1976, Garrick became a regular character in the revived All-Star Comics, partaking in adventures with the Justice Society in stories set in modern times. In 1981, he and the Justice Society appeared in All-Star Squadron in stories set during World War II.

In 1985, DC Comics merged all of its fictional characters into a single shared universe. Jay Garrick now shares the same world as the New Flash. DC wrote the character out of continuity in the one-shot Last Days of the Justice Society but brought the character back in the 1990s due to fan interest. Unlike characters such as Batman or Superman, DC decided not to update Jay as a young hero but portrayed him as a veteran of World War II with a magically-prolonged lifespan. Jay Garrick became a regular character in the JSA and Justice Society of America.

Fictional character biography

Origin

Jason Peter Garrick is a college student, who, prior to 1940 (later retconned to 1938), accidentally inhales hard water vapors after taking a smoke break in his laboratory where he had been working (later stories would change this to heavy water vapors). As a result, he finds that he can run at superhuman speed and has similarly fast reflexes. Retcons imply that the inhalation simply activated a latent metagene.

After a brief career as a college football star, he dons a red shirt with a lightning bolt and a stylized metal helmet with wings (based on images of the Roman god Mercury). He then begins to fight crime as the Flash. The helmet belonged to Jay's father, Joseph, who fought during World War I. He sometimes uses the helmet as a weapon or a type of shield, as seen in Infinite Crisis. He has also used it to direct a beam of light at Eclipso. In The Flash: Rebirth (2010), he used it to destabilize Reverse Flash.

In the early stories, it seems to be generally known that Garrick is the Flash. Later stories would show him as having his identity secret, and that he is able to maintain it without the use of a mask by constantly "vibrating" his features, making him hard to recognize or clearly photograph. The effectiveness of this is debatable, as he later blamed his girlfriend, Joan, deducing his true identity from his lack of a mask. Garrick ultimately revealed his identity as the Flash to the world.

During his career, he would often find himself embroiled in semi-comic situations inadvertently initiated by Winky, Blinky, and Noddy, a trio of tramps known as the Three Dimwits, who tried their hand at one job after another, and never successfully.

His first case involves battling the Faultless Four, a group of blackmailers (Sieur Satan, Serge Orloff, Duriel, and Smythe), who plot to steal an atomic bombarder and sell it. It is later revealed that a professor named Edward Clariss found the last container of heavy water vapors and used it to gain super-speed, becoming the Rival. He briefly takes away Jay's speed after capturing him, making him super-slow, but Jay uses the gases again, allowing him to regain his superspeed and defeat the rival.

Like the Flashes who followed him, Garrick became a close friend of the Green Lantern of his time, Alan Scott, whom he met through the Justice Society of America.

Justice Society of America
The Flash soon became one of the best-known of the Golden Age of superheroes. He was a founding member of the Justice Society of America and served as its first chairman. He was originally based in New York City, but this was later retconned to be in the fictional Keystone City. He left the JSA after issue #6, but returned several years later (issue #24, spring 1945). He had a distinguished career as a crime-fighter during the 1940s.

Garrick's early history was largely the subject of retcons. A story explaining the retirement of the JSA members, including the Flash, explained that, in 1951, the JSA was investigated by the House Un-American Activities Committee for possible Communist sympathies and asked to reveal their identities. This was later revealed to be partly caused by Per Degaton. The JSA declined, and Garrick, who recently married his longtime girlfriend, Joan, retired from superhero life. As a trained scientist, he ran an experimental laboratory for several decades.

The All-Star Squadron Annual #3 issue states that the JSA fought a being named Ian Karkull, who imbued them with energy that slowed their aging, allowing Garrick and many others – as well as their girlfriends and sidekicks – to remain active into the late 20th century without infirmity. The 1990s Starman series notes that the Shade prompted Garrick to come out of retirement in the 1950s, but the details of his activities during this time are hazy at best.

Earth-Two
Garrick emerged from retirement in 1961 to meet the Silver Age Flash, Barry Allen, from a parallel world. The rest of the JSA soon joined the Flash, although their activities during the 1960s (other than their annual meeting with Earth-One's Justice League of America) were unrecorded, although it is clear that Garrick and Green Lantern (Alan Scott) were good friends. It is also established that Garrick has become a respected scientist on his Earth.

Garrick was a key member of the JSA's 1970s adventures (as chronicled in All-Star Comics and Adventure Comics). Garrick also helped to launch the careers of Infinity Inc. Following the Crisis on Infinite Earths, all the parallel worlds are merged into one, and Keystone City becomes the twin city of Allen's Central City, with the two separated by a river. An updated story suggests that Keystone in this new continuity is rendered invisible and wiped from the memories of the world for many years through the actions of several supervillains.

21st Century

In the early 21st century, many of Garrick's JSA cohorts have retired or died, but Garrick remains active with the latest incarnation of the group. He is physically about 50 years old, thanks to the effects of several accidental anti-aging treatments, but his chronological age is closer to 90. He is one of the few surviving members of the Justice Society of America after Zero Hour. Of the three original JSA members still on the team (along with Alan Scott and Wildcat), Jay takes a fatherly approach toward his teammates and the DC superhero community in general.

Infinite Crisis and One Year Later

Garrick and his wife, Joan, had guardianship of Bart Allen after Max Mercury's disappearance. During the events of Infinite Crisis, Garrick states that the Speed Force is gone after a battle in which many speedsters, living and dead, wrestle Superboy-Prime into the Speed Force and disappear. Garrick is left behind on Earth by the other speedsters when he reaches his speed limit and cannot follow. Bart Allen returns, aged several years, having absorbed the entire Speed Force during his pursuit of the escaped Superboy-Prime. Garrick claims that without the Speed Force, his own power is less than before: like Wally West in the Crisis on Infinite Earths aftermath, he can only run close to the speed of sound. He also states that, as the Speed Force is no longer retarding his aging, his speed is diminishing with time. After Bart leaves Keystone City for Los Angeles, Garrick, once again, is the city's sole guardian. After hearing news of Bart's demise, Garrick collapses with grief, consoled by Jesse Chambers.

Garrick continues his work as a member of the reformed Justice Society of America, under the leadership of Power Girl. After the death of Bart Allen, Garrick's full speed returns. Garrick is currently the mayor of Monument Point, where the JSA is now based. He faces problems due to the JSA being based in the Town, but after talking to another official, who says that, as Garrick is not a politician, he doesn't have to worry about being re-elected, Garrick gains confidence. Soon after this, he holds a funeral for Alan Scott, who is killed defeating the villain D'arken, and tells the Justice Society that they must endure.

Velocity
In the Outsiders: One Year Later story arc, a clone of Garrick called Velocity appears as an antagonist, created by the Brotherhood of Evil. He appears to be in his late 20s or early 30s and is brainwashed into working for a Malinese dictator named Ratu Bennin. Velocity is defeated by the combined efforts of the Outsiders. He possesses Jay Garrick's super-speed, but none of his memories or expertise. His unconscious body is placed in the custody of Alan Scott, Checkmate's White King, who states that the Outsiders could not be trusted.

Because of lingering issues in the cloning process, made more unpredictable by the metagene itself, the clone is infected by a fast-acting version of the clone plague deteriorating and shortening the lifespan of clones in the DC Universe. This makes it difficult for Checkmate to find a way to wake him and undo his brainwash, because, even with his special suit, tailored to stave the degenerating process, he would be doomed to a slow death whenever he awakens from his suspended animation.

Brightest Day
In Brightest Day, Garrick and the rest of the JSA help Alan Scott and his children overcome the power of the Starheart, and, in turn, help save the planet from the Dark Avatar. After the events of the Brightest Day, Garrick and the rest of the JSA travel to the city of Monument Point, which has been attacked by a superpowered terrorist named Scythe. Just before being defeated, Scythe snaps Jay's long standing friend Alan Scott's neck. In the following story, it is revealed that Scythe is the product of Nazi genetic engineering, and that Scott and Garrick had been tasked by the president with killing him back when he was in infancy during World War II. The two heroes could not agree on a course of action, and, as a result, Scythe was allowed to live. Doctor Mid-Nite discovers that the injuries Scott sustained have paralyzed Scott, and that any attempt to heal himself could break his constant concentration, which could result in the Starheart once again regaining control of his body.

Jade visits her bed-ridden father in the Emerald City, and offers to use her abilities to help him walk again. Scott declines his daughter's offer, reasoning that if the Starheart were to once again take over his body, it could result in the deaths of everyone in the city. Eclipso attacks the city, which results in Jesse Quick having to get Scott to safety.

Later, the JSA tries to take down the villain D'arken, who has broken free from imprisonment beneath Monument Point and absorbed the powers of JSA members, but D'arken is too powerful for the JSA to take him down. Due to the entity's ability to absorb powers from superhumans in its vicinity, only non-superpowered and magical members fight D'arken. The JSA tells Alan Scott that unleashing the Starheart is the only way to destroy D'arken. However, after releasing the Starheart energies, Scott's body begins to incinerate itself. Afterwards, the JSA attends a funeral for Scott, whom they believe to be dead. Garrick is upset at having lost one of his closest friends and founding members of the JSA.

DC Rebirth

Following the return of Wally West to DC continuity during DC Rebirth, Barry Allen is overwhelmed by the Speed Force when he shakes hands with Wally West. This not only causes Barry to become possessed by an echo of Eobard Thawne, but also causes Barry to start being absorbed into the Speed Force itself. It takes both Wally and the current Kid Flash's interference to prevent Barry from being absorbed for good. Barry later reveals that, when he was overwhelmed by the Speed Force, he saw visions of possible future events. He also reveals his last glimpse before he was returned to normal was that something more was trapped inside the Speed Force and although he could not recognize it, it still filled him with hope. The object that Barry saw was then revealed to be the helmet of the pre-Flashpoint Jay Garrick.

While tracking a mysterious force responsible for the recent universal reset, Barry and Batman experience another vision in the form of a vision of Jay's helmet, although he attributes it to the helmet of Mercury. While chasing Thawne, Bruce and Barry can hear someone calling out for the latter, but Barry believes it to be calls from lost moments that could have been. As the Cosmic Treadmill begins to break apart, the voice intensifies, and Bruce tells Barry to listen and grab onto the voice. As the voice says "Jay", Barry says the name as well, and Jay Garrick arrives, claiming he is free and provides enough speed and power to get Batman and Barry back home. Jay explains he didn't kill Thawne, he is a friend, and (also) The Flash. He tries to get Barry to remember who he is; Barry is unable to, but finds Jay familiar and somehow trusts him. Then Jay is absorbed by a blue light and taken away. Barry believes Jay may be from another time that no longer exists and Barry is not the person that keeps him tethered to reality, saying he's "not his lightning rod."

In the "Watchmen" sequel "Doomsday Clock," Lois Lane finds a flash-drive among a mess of papers while at the Daily Planet. It shows her footage of Alan Scott and the rest of the Justice Society. When Doctor Manhattan undoes his experiment that erased the Justice Society of America and the Legion of Super-Heroes, Garrick appears with the Justice Society when they and the Legion of Super-Heroes arrive to help Superman fight Black Adam's group and the foreign superheroes.

Jay Garrick stars in “At the Starting Line”, a story included in the milestone celebration issue The Flash #750. This is Jay's first solo story in over a decade. In a single-panel cameo, a figure in a yellow costume (revealed to be Eobard Thawne) whispers to Jay that he will be forgotten in the future during his fight with Thinker. It appears to take place in the same continuity as the main line of Flash comics, as the final panel show the images of the future Flashes as well as members of their Rogues gallery while Jay muses on the future. Jay assists the Flash family when it comes to fighting Eobard Thawne and his Legion of Zoom.

In the pages of "Dark Nights: Death Metal," Jay Garrick was with Alan Scott, Doctor Fate, and Wildcat where they guarded the Valhalla Cemetery. When Darkest Knight and the Robin King break into Valhalla Cemetery to target Wally's power, Jay Garrick, Barry Allen, and Wally West run with the Darkest Knight giving chase. Barry, Wally, and Jay team up with Kid Flash and the rest of the Flash family to outrun the Darkest Knight and his army of Dark Multiverse Flashes to reach the Mobius Chair. Flash was with the Justice Society when heroes and villains alike prepared themselves for the final battle against Perpetua and the Darkest Knight. Jay fought against one of the Last 52 heroes where he engaged with his Nazi counterpart. Then he and Barry fought a Last 52 version of Wally West that had the powers of Doctor Manhattan where Jay was killed by him. When the Hands undid the damages caused by Perpetua and Darkest Night and restored Earth-0 to its Pre-Metalverse state, Jay was among the superheroes revived by them.

In the pages of "The New Golden Age" one-shot, a flashback to 1940 had Flash among the Justice Society members about to get a group photo taken by Johnny Thunder when Doctor Fate has a vision about "lost children". The final panel reveals the bio of Flash's daughter Judy Garrick who time-traveled from the 1960s to assist her father until the day she was born. Afterwards, she mysteriously vanished. When a Huntress from a possible future ends up sent to 1940, Flash is among the Justice Society members that meet her. When Doctor Fate tries to read Huntress' mind about the threat in her future, Flash is among those that are knocked down by the magical feedback.

Powers and abilities
As the Flash, Garrick can run at superhuman speeds and has superhumanly-fast reflexes, tapping into the Speed Force. The limits of his speed have fluctuated over the years, though he has usually been second to DC's "flagship" Flash, Barry Allen and his successor, Wally West.

In his earliest appearances, Garrick's speed was derived from a metagene that activated after he inhaled hard water vapors. According to himself, he initially could run just shy of the speed of sound. He could carry people away with him at super-speed without causing injury due to extreme acceleration. He could make himself invisible by vibrating his body at high frequencies and disguise his features by vibrating his molecules. Once he met Barry Allen, he surpassed his limitations, citing running at 'twenty times the speed of sound', seemingly able to tap into the Speed Force. He has since displayed speed absorption, time travel and interdimensional shifting abilities.

When Bart Allen absorbed the Speed Force during Infinite Crisis, his speed was diminished to the same level as his early adventures. He struggled to surpass the speed of sound and lost many of his higher powers. Once the Speed Force returned, Jay's powers were fully restored.

Collected editions

Supporting characters

Joan Garrick

Joan Williams, later Joan Garrick, is a fictional character from DC Comics, a supporting character and romantic interest of Flash (Jay Garrick). She was the earliest recurring supporting character of Flash within the DC Universe. 

First depicted as the girlfriend, and later wife, of Jay Garrick. The character was created by Gardner Fox and Harry Lampert and first appeared in Flash Comics #1 (January 1940). She appeared in the cover alongside Flash on the issue. She would remain the supporting character of the titular character throughout the Golden Age, and she was revived through the Silver Age in "Flash of Two Worlds" where she is revealed to be a part of Earth-Two.

Joan Williams was depicted as the college crush of Jay Garrick, who Joan originally rejected. Later, after obtaining speedster powers, Jay used them to become a football star to impress Joan and later decided to be a superhero, the Flash. The Flash helped Joan when his father was kidnapped. She would remain a girlfriend and confidante to the Flash. Unlike Lois Lane and Superman, Joan was always aware of the Flash's secret identity. The events of Crisis on Infinite Earths retconned both Jay and Joan and the entire Keystone City citizens as being in a coma until Barry Allen revived them. The couple ultimately married, and Jay retired from the Justice Society of America for a while until later returning to the group.

Joan was described as an essential part of the Golden Age Flash's life in later decades by Mark Ginnochio of Comicbook.com. Joan and Jay's marriage is cited as being "among the most popular of DC's earliest married characters" by Vaneta Rogers of Newsarama. Jim Beard in the book The Flash Companion wrote positively of the character's depiction by Sheldon Mayer which he felt was an example of "strong females" at the time. John Wells, in the same book, compared Gardner Fox's deriving of the character to other works of characters like Dian Belmont of Sandman, Inza Cramer of Doctor Fate and Shiera Hall of Hawkman that the female romantic interests weren't just lovers but also confidantes of their respective superheroes as depicted at the time. 

Joan Garrick appears in the Young Justice animated series, voiced by Kath Soucie. She returns in the episode "Illusion of Control" as she is shown to be gravely ill and is in a hospital. She dies offscreen in the episode "Early Warning."

Joan Williams appeared as the Earth-3 doppelgänger of Nora Allen in Season 6 of the Flash episode "A Flash of the Lightning" portrayed by Michelle Harrison. She is the wife of Jay Garrick.

Winky, Blinky, and Noddy

Other versions

Earth 2

Following the 2011 reboot of the DC comics universe, a new version of Jay Garrick is introduced in the first issue of the Earth 2 comic book. This version of Garrick, portrayed as a 21-year-old recent college graduate, is spurned by his girlfriend Joan, and possesses very little in terms of career prospects. The character receives his superspeed from Mercury, a dying Roman god who sees bravery in Garrick and is also the last god to fall following a war with Apokolips. Mercury claims that he has been held for the past 10 years by a greater threat than Apokolips. Garrick escapes a World Army Helicopter that sees the event as Mercury dies telling Garrick to run. He saves a couple from Apokorats, saying he will do it in "a Flash". Later, Garrick arrives in Poland and meets Hawkgirl. Working alongside Hawkgirl and Alan Scott, he assists in defeating Solomon Grundy, making his first public debut as the Flash.

Earth 2's Jay Garrick is among the different Flashes that appear on Prime Earth to help fight Eobard Thawne and his Legion of Zoom.

52 and Countdown
In the final issue of DC's year-long series 52 in 2007, a new Multiverse is revealed, originally consisting of 52 identical realities. Among the parallel realities shown, one is designated "Earth-2". As a result of Mister Mind "eating" aspects of this reality, it takes on visual aspects similar to the pre-Crisis Earth-Two, now called Earth-2, to distinguish the two separate realities. In one-panel, a new counterpart to Jay Garrick is shown, among other Justice Society of America characters. The names of the characters and the team are not mentioned in the panel in which they appear, but they are later specifically used in the Countdown: Arena series, where the new Earth-2 Flash is specifically identified as Jay Garrick and does not allow others to call him "Flash". Despite being an almost exact duplicate to the original World War II Garrick, it is shown that the new Earth-2 Garrick is much younger, having no gray hair at all. Other Garricks are shown in the 52 multiverse. A second young Jay Garrick lives on the unspecified Earth that Wally West went to with his young children at the beginning of Bart Allen's tenure as the Flash. This Garrick is separate from the young post-Crisis Earth-2 Garrick, as the post-Crisis Earth-2 heroes make no mention of Wally or his children on their Earth.

The multiverse established in 52 was later replaced following DC's 2011 Flashpoint storyline. Following this, a new multiverse was established, and every series was relaunched as part of DC's The New 52 publishing event. The post-52 pre-Flashpoint Earth-2 Jay Garrick ceases to exist, as did the mainstream Jay Garrick. A new but entirely different Earth-2 Jay Garrick then becomes the continually published version of the character (see publication history).

Elseworlds
In the Elseworlds book JSA: The Unholy Three, Jay Garrick is portrayed as a post-WW2 United States intelligence agent stationed in Russia, working under the code-name Mercury. He is instrumental in bringing down the story's rogue Superman.

Wonderland
When Brother Grimm helped Captain Cold and Mirror Master trap Wally West in an alternate world where the Speed Force never existed, it is revealed that Jay Garrick never gained his speed in the accident and died during the Second World War.

Flashpoint
In the Flashpoint reality, Jay Garrick died rather than developing super-speed after inhaling hard water.

In other media

Television

Animation
 An analogue of Jay Garrick called The Streak appears in the Justice League two-part episode "Legends", voiced by David Naughton. He was a speedster from an alternate universe and member of the Justice Guild of America who died alongside his team during a war that destroyed most of their home universe.
 Jay Garrick appears in Batman: The Brave and the Bold, voiced by Andy Milder. This version is a frequent ally of Batman and member of the Justice Society of America (JSA).
 Jay and Joan Garrick appear in Young Justice, voiced by Geoff Pierson and Kath Soucie respectively. The series' version of the former is a retired member of the Justice Society of America (JSA) who does not appear to possess his comic book counterpart's decelerated aging. Throughout the series, the Garricks become Impulse's legal guardians while Jay comes out of retirement to help the Justice League and the Team to thwart a Reach invasion. As of the episode "Early Warning", Joan has died. As of season four, Jay has joined the Justice League.
 Jay Garrick appears in the Mad segment "That's What Super Friends Are For".

Live-action

 Jay Garrick is alluded to in The Flash (1990). Most notably, the series' version of Barry Allen has an older brother named Jay Allen (portrayed by Tim Thomerson), who is named after Garrick. After Jay is murdered in the pilot episode, Barry is inspired to become the Flash.
 Jay Garrick appears in the Smallville two-part episode "Absolute Justice", portrayed by Billy Mitchell. This version operated as a superhero, member of the Justice Society of America (JSA), and a research scientist in the 1970s until he was framed for fraud by the government as part of their plan to disable the JSA. Garrick and his teammates falsely confessed to all charges, but were never convicted and forced to retire to due to their secret identities becoming known to law enforcement.
 Jay Garrick appears in The Flash (2014). While the character was heavily advertised as being portrayed by Teddy Sears throughout the second season, it is later revealed he was actually Hunter Zolomon / Zoom masquerading as Garrick. The real Garrick is introduced in the season finale as the Flash of Earth-3 and a doppelgänger of Henry Allen (portrayed by John Wesley Shipp) who had been held captive by Zolomon in a failed attempt to siphon Garrick's Speed Force energy before Garrick is eventually freed. Garrick returns in the third season, serving as a stern mentor to Barry Allen and helping him defeat Savitar. In the fourth season, after helping Barry and Jesse Quick avert a disaster utilizing "Flashtime", a state in which they move so fast that time appears to be frozen, Garrick announces his retirement and that he will be training a protégée to succeed him as Earth-3's Flash. As of the sixth season, Garrick has retired and settled down with his wife Joan Williams (portrayed by Michelle Harrison), with whom he worked on tracking antimatter signatures across the multiverse and later help Barry uncover his role in an impending "Crisis". In the seventh season, following the Crisis, Jay and Joan now reside on Earth-Prime Keystone City, where she attempts to help him get his speed back.
 Jay Garrick appears in Stargirl, portrayed by an uncredited actor in season one and portrayed again by John Wesley Shipp in the second and third seasons. This version is a member of the Justice Society of America before the team was attacked and killed by the Injustice Society, with Garrick being apparently killed by Icicle. After making appearances in flashbacks depicted in the second season, Garrick turns up alive 20 years later in the third season finale "Frenemies – Chapter Thirteen: The Reckoning".

Film
 Jay Garrick makes a cameo appearance in Justice League: The New Frontier, in which he is forced out of heroics by the government.
 The Earth-2 incarnation of Jay Garrick appears in Justice Society: World War II, voiced by Armen Taylor. This version is a founding member of the Justice Society of America who was active during his Earth's version of the titular war.

Video games
 Jay Garrick appears in Batman: The Brave and the Bold - The Videogame, voiced again by Andy Milder. 
 Jay Garrick appears in DC Universe Online, voiced by Ryan Wickerham.
 The Earth-2 incarnation of Jay Garrick's outfit appears as a downloadable costume for Barry Allen / Flash in Injustice: Gods Among Us.
 Jay Garrick appears as a "premier skin" for Barry Allen / Flash in Injustice 2, voiced by Travis Willingham. Additionally, Garrick makes a cameo appearance in Allen's single-player ending.
 Jay Garrick appears as a playable character in DC Legends.

Miscellaneous
 The Smallville incarnation of Jay Garrick / Flash appears in Smallville Season 11, in which it is revealed that his leg was disabled and that he could no longer run at superhuman speed, which allowed the government to arrest him. After he retired, he became a recluse. In the present, Clark Kent and Bart Allen find Garrick and consult him on how to defeat the Black Flash. After Bart sacrifices himself to defeat the Black Flash, a guilt-ridden Garrick forms a school for gifted children in San Francisco as well as the Teen Titans and goes on to get his leg repaired.
 Jay Garrick / Flash appears in the Injustice: Gods Among Us prequel comic as a charter member of the Justice Society of America (JSA) and a friend of Barry Allen. After the Joker gains possession of an amulet that allows the owner to possess individuals, he uses it on the JSA to hurt the Justice League. Allen tries to reach out to a possessed Garrick, but the Joker eventually forces the latter to kill himself, which leaves a lasting effect on Barry.

References

External links
 Flash (Jay Garrick) entry on DCDatabaseProject
 Flash (1939) at Don Markstein's Toonopedia. Archived from the original on July 30, 2016.
 

All-American Publications characters
Characters created by Gardner Fox
Characters created by Harry Lampert
Comics characters introduced in 1940
DC Comics characters who can move at superhuman speeds
DC Comics characters with accelerated healing
DC Comics characters with superhuman senses
DC Comics male superheroes
DC Comics metahumans
DC Comics scientists
Earth-Two
Fictional characters from parallel universes
Fictional characters with slowed ageing
Fictional characters with dimensional travel abilities
Fictional characters with electric or magnetic abilities
Fictional characters who can manipulate sound
Fictional characters who can manipulate time
Fictional characters who can turn intangible
Fictional characters who can turn invisible
Fictional characters with air or wind abilities
Fictional characters with absorption or parasitic abilities
Fictional characters with density control abilities
Fictional empaths
Fictional players of American football
Flash (comics) characters
Golden Age superheroes
Time travelers
Fictional characters displaced in time